Bangkok Futsal Club (Thai สโมสรฟุตซอลกรุงเทพมหานคร), also known as Bangkok BTS FC., is a Thai futsal club based in Bangkok. The club currently plays in the Thailand Futsal League.

Honours

Cup 
 Thai Futsal FA Cup
  Winners (1) : 2017-18

Regional
AFF Futsal Club Championship
  Winners (1) : 2018

Current players

External links 

Futsal clubs in Thailand
Sport in Bangkok
Futsal clubs established in 2008
2008 establishments in Thailand